Kplang is a Guang language of Ghana. It is partially intelligible with Chumburung, especially with the neighboring dialect.

References

Guang languages
Languages of Ghana